Moghari railway station is located in Pakistan.

See also
 List of railway stations in Pakistan
 Pakistan Railways

References

External links

Railway stations in Balochistan, Pakistan
Railway stations on Rohri–Chaman Railway Line
Defunct railway stations in Pakistan